Josip Šolić (born 24 February 1988) is a Croatian former professional footballer who played as a goalkeeper.

References

External links
 

1988 births
Living people
People from Solin
Association football goalkeepers
Croatian footballers
SC Freiburg II players
NK Solin players
HNK Zmaj Makarska players
NK Mosor players
Silkeborg IF players
NK Dugopolje players
First Football League (Croatia) players
Croatian expatriate footballers
Croatian expatriate sportspeople in Germany
Expatriate footballers in Germany
Croatian expatriate sportspeople in Denmark
Expatriate men's footballers in Denmark